Henry Grubstick is a fictional character portrayed by Christopher Gorham and featured in American comedy-drama Ugly Betty. 

It is known that Grubstick has Dutch ancestry, due to the episode "Betty's Wait Problem", so that Grubstick is a Dutch-American. The name "Grubstick" is stated to be Dutch for "He who gives the fairest prices for his bricks" (Note that in reality, Grubstick does not make any sense at all in Dutch). Throughout the series, Henry and Betty were star crossed lovers as Hilda and Ignacio tried to keep Betty away from Henry, and Charlie tried to keep Henry away from Betty. This made Henry and Betty have to battle to stay together. Like Amanda Tanen, Henry shares a last name with a real-life member of Ugly Betty's production staff — writer David Grubstick. Henry's character may be based on Michell Doinel, Catalina Ángel's French friend who falls in love with Betty during her soujorn in Cartagena.

Background
Henry is an accountant on the 3rd floor for Meade Publications who catches Betty's eye. Although he was introduced in "The Lyin', the Watch and the Wardrobe", his first appearance was in the much delayed episode "Swag", which aired January 4, 2007 as an extended flashback.

Henry, who hails from Tucson, Arizona, is a bit of a bookworm with an excellent memory for facts and figures. He often sprinkles such facts in his conversations with Betty, followed by the statement "It's just something I know." Betty and Henry appear to mutually share an attraction, and they seem to be heading towards a relationship. However, Betty abruptly leaves the Christmas party after misunderstanding a situation where a model forces a kiss on Henry. This drives Betty back to her ex-boyfriend, Walter. When Henry calls after the party, he is intercepted by Betty's sister, Hilda. Knowing his attraction to Betty will doom her relationship with Walter, Hilda "loses" Henry's message.

As the first half of season one ends, Betty finds herself in a romantic dilemma: She still has feelings for Henry even as she tries to work things out with Walter. Betty continues to avoid Henry, but learns Henry's "kiss" with the model was not his fault. During the episode "I'm Coming Out," Betty is busy organizing Fashion Week for MODE and she re-encounters Henry for the first time since the Christmas party. After Hilda further interferes with them conversing, Henry eventually asks Betty why she never returned his call. She discovers that Henry called to see Rudolph the Red-Nosed Reindeer and Hilda purposely "lost" the message.

The two resume talking. Unaware that Betty is back with Walter, in the episode "Brothers," Henry asks Betty on a date to see the musical Wicked, but Betty affirms "just as friends." That night, Walter tells Betty he accepted a management position in Maryland, and the two break up. At the same time, Henry is seen at Betty's desk at MODE with a gift, a Wicked shirt with a note that read: "Can't wait, green girl!" But the following morning, Henry confesses to Betty he had a surprise visit from his ex-girlfriend from Tucson, Charlie, who wants to reconcile their relationship. Not knowing Betty and Walter have broken up, Henry gives Betty the Wicked tickets, apologizing, and leaves Betty broken-hearted.

The following week in the episode Derailed, Henry is surprised when he finds Betty and his now official girlfriend, Charlie, talking in the lunch room. He later thanks Betty for inviting Charlie to a party and he's confident Betty does not feel anything for him; that is until Betty calls him over to a downtown subway station and he finds out she lost track of Charlie intentionally. He then questions Betty as to why she did it and finds out her true feelings for him. Just at the moment when Henry and Betty are about to kiss, Charlie appears again with a smile on her face, saying: "It was fate that separated us, Betty" and also states she will stay in NY indefinitely.

In Secretaries' Day, a semi-conscious Henry tells Betty he loves her. In the following episode, A Tree Grows in Guadalajara Betty believes she sees Henry in Mexico. She follows the apparition and discovers her grandmother's house. Her senile grandmother, mistaking Betty for her mother Rosa, encourages her to fight for her love. Betty resolves to fight for Henry.

In the Season 1 finale, Charlie declares she is pregnant, and Henry opts to go with her to Tucson after a long, tearful goodbye with Betty. However, Charlie has been cheating on Henry with Dr. Farkas for 2 months, and therefore there is a chance the baby might not be his.

The Season 2 premiere, "How Betty Got Her Grieve Back", ends with Henry getting off a bus in New York City. He tells Betty (in the following episode) that he has returned to Meade because he needs the benefits for his child-to-be and that there were no job offers in Tucson. However, in "Family/Affair", Christina tells him the truth about Charlie's infidelity. Henry shows up at Betty's house intoxicated from wine coolers and declaring his love for her. Betty is hesitant to resume her romance with him, and they agree to wait. Henry, after some time, finally calls Charlie and she confesses everything. They agree he should take a paternity test.

Henry, at Betty's request, tutors a grieving Justin in Algebra. Justin's self-admitted "bad-ass" behavior, and Henry's inability to manage him, agitate Henry greatly. Confused, Betty asks him why; he responds it is because he is about to be a father, in the process revealing that he is the father of Charlie's baby. Betty asks him to leave, and any hope for their relationship comes to a screeching halt.

Episode 2.05 "A League of Their Own" begins with Betty attempting to land a date with an online suitor and trying to avoid Henry completely. The date, however, goes sour and Henry, conveniently spying on Betty's date, cheers her up and takes her out to dinner. The dinner is awkward, to say the least, and two are mistaken for a couple preparing for an engagement. A woman from another table cries out, "He's proposing!" This is the last straw and Betty promptly leaves the restaurant, running home.  Things between Betty and Henry seem to be at their very worst, until Betty emerges from her home after shutting the door in Henry's face and they share a kiss, affirming that their relationship can't be stopped under any circumstance.

In episode 2.06, "Something Wicked This Way Comes", Betty's family is concerned for her loneliness, Christina is unaware, and Daniel threatens to fire Henry. Betty, using her usual "good judgment", decides to keep their romance a secret.  Inconspicuously, Henry and Betty continue to date and go to a showing of the Broadway hit, Wicked because they couldn’t do it the year before. However, Daniel and Gio give the pair a hard time and their date is an utter disaster; from a fight in the lobby via illicit text messages to actually stopping a live performance.  As Betty continues to feel like her heart is in the wrong place by lying to everyone she cares about, she decides to call the night off. Henry is upset about keeping their relationship a secret and explains that Betty won't be the only one suffering from a broken heart.  The first date is a nightmare and Betty returns to her home, crying on Hilda’s shoulder. However, after Hilda gives her some sisterly advice, Betty knocks on Henry’s apartment door and the pair reconcile.

In the next episode, Betty's father discovers she has been sneaking into Henry's apartment in secret and after a family fight, she leaves, planning to move out. Henry tells Betty she can move in with him and the two start living together.  This is immediately discouraging as they realize in a matter of months Henry will have to move back to father his child. Henry convinces Betty to reconcile with her father, as Ignacio will still be there for Betty after Henry leaves.

Following this, things between Betty and Henry seem to be going splendidly, with a flamboyant display of flirting between them occurring frequently. Henry pretends to be infatuated with the weekend receptionist, L'Amanda, in order for Betty to sneak into her office to obtain Bradford Meade's will.

Things start to get shaky when Henry walks into the Suarez residence seeing Gio dancing with Betty, and apparently having a good time. Back at Henry's apartment, Betty tries to replicate Gio's flamboyantly romantic description of how he would theoretically treat the "woman he loved" in the short time they had left together, and Henry only gets frustrated. He tries awkwardly to go along with what Betty wants, which includes Betty attempting to eat ice cream off Henry's stomach with scalding chocolate sauce, and Latin dancing. At the dance club Henry becomes very defensive as Gio tries to impress Betty and Hilda. Henry's sleeve catches on fire and he storms out. Later, as Betty tries to call him, Henry returns and starts dancing shirtless out on the floor. Betty appreciates Henry's effort to make her happy, and they leave the club. However, in another episode, Henry's competitive side is brought up again, when he jealously challenges Gio to see how many phone numbers they can collect from women. He also tells Betty he is uncomfortable about her relationship with Gio. Betty responds by saying she'll stop seeing Gio, but she continues to see him and lies about it to Henry. When he finds out, after an incident where he accidentally ends up punching Gio, he says she can be friends with whomever she wants and they seem to be still strong. However, when a heavily-pregnant Charlie shows up in New York, she constantly tries to interfere in their relationship and ruins their dates by pretending to be ill, coming home early and generally demanding Henry's presence. She later tells Betty it was because it was so difficult seeing the man she loved in love with someone else.

The tension in Henry and Betty's relationship over his impending departure seems to have been taken care of when Henry proposes that instead they stay "together forever", flying back and forth to each other. While Betty is initially thrilled by the idea, when she sees Henry holding his newborn son after Charlie goes into labour at a baby shower Betty had thrown to try to bond with her, she cries as she sees it as the end of the relationship after advice from Claire Meade and Ignacio.

This does not prove to be the case when Henry comes back and pops the question to Betty, who has already been asked by Gio to go to Rome with him. It is later revealed in "The Manhattan Project" that Betty chose neither Henry nor Gio, ending her relationship with Gio and refusing Henry's proposal. However, Betty learns from his replacement at the accounting department that Henry has a Facebook account, revealing he now travels in South America with a new girlfriend named Samantha. Despite the surprise news, Betty does answer his invitation to join his Facebook list.

Betty and Henry meet once again when Henry returns to New York for a few days with his new girlfriend. As Betty is talking to Matt over the phone, she sees Henry hailing a cab, which prompts her to drop the beverage she is holding. She continues to "Facebook stalk" him for the next couple of days. This is helped by Henry making constant updates of where he is and what he's doing in NYC.  One day, Betty ("encouraged" by Amanda and Marc) decides to visit the coffee place where she thinks Henry might still be.  Unexpectedly they bump into each other on the street. Here we meet his girlfriend, Chloe. Thanks to Amanda and Marc, Betty ends up making a double date with Henry and Chloe. During the date, at a baseball game, Matt sees the first sign of Betty still being attracted to Henry, but they talk it out afterward. However, after a terrible day at work, Betty ends up contacting Henry (who updates he's leaving NYC). Henry helps Betty through her tough time and they end up admitting they still have feelings for one another. Henry even admits that his many Facebook updates were an attempt to lure her to him. As they have a goodbye hug, Henry kisses Betty but both pull away, until Betty goes in for the kiss. As this happens, Matt shows up and witnesses Betty's cheating. Betty continues to feel guilty, but thanks to Hilda's advice she doesn't tell Matt, leading to Matt breaking up with Betty.

Henry next appears towards the end of Season 4 in the episode "London Calling." Following a night out in London, Christina informs Betty that she had spent the night drunk-dialling her ex-boyfriends. Although Betty thinks nothing of it, the episode ends with Henry receiving the message that Betty had left him, inviting him to Hilda's upcoming wedding as her date. Henry shows up in New York with his son to meet Betty, telling her that he has a job offer. It is slightly hinted especially for Henry that they still have feelings for each other, but they agree that it's not three years ago and decide to just stay acquaintances. He does not join the wedding and Betty confesses to Daniel that he was right she was going backwards with Henry, but she also admits that she and Henry are in two different places in their lives. Later on, she decides to take up the offer to work a youth magazine company in London and leaves.

Notes

Ugly Betty characters
Fictional characters from Arizona
Fictional accountants
Television characters introduced in 2006

fr:Liste des personnages d'Ugly Betty